Jon Clarke may refer to:

Jon Clarke (rugby union) (born 1983), rugby union player
Jon Clarke (rugby league) (born 1979), rugby league player
Jonty Clarke (Jonathan Clarke, born 1981), English field hockey player
Jonathan Clarke (cyclist), Australian cyclist
Jono Clarke (1944–2020), Rhodesian cricketer

See also
J. C. D. Clark (Jonathan Clark, born 1951), British historian
Jonathan Clark Rogers (1885–1967), academic
John Clarke (disambiguation)